Elections to the Mizoram Legislative Assembly were held on 2 December 2008, the counting was done on 8 December 2008. There were 40 seats for the assembly elections. The Indian National Congress swept the elections by winning 32 seats, Mizo National Front 3, others 5.

Result

Elected Members

References

State Assembly elections in Mizoram
2000s in Mizoram
2008 State Assembly elections in India